Gluto may refer to:

Gluto, a mafioso-like villain from Power Rangers: Time Force
Gluto, a gelatinous character from Ben 10: Secret of the Omnitrix
Gluto.com, a leading syndicate manager for the EuroMillions Lottery